Doubledogdare (1953–1974) was an American Thoroughbred Champion racehorse. Bred and raced by the renowned Claiborne Farm of Bull Hancock, she was sired by Double Jay, the American Champion Two-Year-Old Colt of 1946 and a four-time Leading broodmare sire in North America. Her dam was Flaming Top, a daughter of  1935 U.S. Triple Crown champion Omaha.

Conditioned for racing by Moody Jolley, at age two Doubledogdare earned important wins including the 1955 Matron Stakes under future U.S. Racing Hall of Fame inductee Eric Guerin and the 1955 National Stallion Stakes, Fillies Division when ridden by another future Hall of Fame jockey, Jack Westrope. Doubledogdare's 1955 performances saw her win six of ten starts and finish second twice, earning $127,689. She was voted American Champion Two-Year-Old Filly by Daily Racing Form and Turf & Sports Digest magazine. Nasrina won the rival Thoroughbred Racing Association award.

Racing at age three, Doubledogdare won the Oaks Prep defeating Princess Turia as the 2/5 odds on favorite. and then ran second by a neck in the Kentucky Oaks when Princess Turia turned the tables. Among her other important wins in 1956 were the Ashland and Spinster Stakes, helping give her the American Champion Three-Year-Old Filly title.

Retired to broodmare duty, Doubledogdare produced foals that met with very little success in racing.

References

1953 racehorse births
1974 racehorse deaths
Thoroughbred family 8-f
Racehorses bred in Kentucky
Racehorses trained in the United States
American Champion racehorses